is a Japanese astronomer and discoverer of minor planets.

Between 1986 and 1991, he has discovered or co-discovered 16 of asteroids at the Nihondaira Observatory in Shimizu, Japan. His co-discoverers were the Japanese astronomers Takeshi Urata, Watari Kakei and Hitoshi Shiozawa (see adjunct table).

References 
 

Discoverers of asteroids

20th-century Japanese astronomers
Living people
Year of birth missing (living people)